is a Japanese voice actor affiliated with 81 Produce. He also had a recurring role in both the Japanese and English language Pokémon anime which saw him voicing Jessie's Arbok up until Episode 6 of the Hoenn series which saw Arbok and its companion, Weezing being released to help protect a herd of Koffing and Ekans who had been captured by a hunter.

He also appeared in the Orange League series, voicing the Orange Crew leader and champion Drake's Electabuzz and later reappeared during the Hoenn League series, voicing Morrison's Steelix in both the Japanese and English-language versions of the series. He also provided the voice for various minor characters.

He is also known for being the voice actor of Prince Hata from the anime Gintama.

Filmography

Television animation
Pocket Monsters (1997) (Musashi's Arbo/Arbok, Additional voices)
Nightwalker (1998) (Anonymous Man (ep. 4), Criminal (ep. 3))
Bubu Chacha (1999) (Terry)
Dual! Parallel Trouble Adventure (1999) (Male Operator, Toshihiko Izawa)
Kaikan Phrase (1999) (Director (ep. 32), Black suit (ep. 33), Producer (ep. 38))
Pocket Monsters: Episode Orange Archipelago (1999) (Musashi's Arbok, Additional voices)
Pocket Monsters: Episode Gold & Silver (1999) (Musashi's Arbok, Additional voices)
Baby Felix (2000) (Zoo)
Boogiepop Phantom (2000) (Teacher A (ep. 7))
Noir (2001) (Dupois, Loshuman, Renoir)
Parappa the Rapper (2001) (Monster (ep. 12))
Ai Yori Aoshi (2002) (Tanaka)
Jing: King of Bandits (2002) (Crash d'Ice (ep. 11, 12, 13)
Petite Princess Yucie (2002) (Guard (ep. 1, 6))
Pocket Monsters: Advanced Generation (2002) (Contesta, Enishida, Musashi's Arbok, Additional voices)
Rockman EXE (2002-2003) (NapalmMan, strange old man/shopkeeper, Kumagoro Saito)
Bobobo-bo Bo-bobo (2003) (Eldest Dynamite Brother (ep. 3))
Fullmetal Alchemist (2003) (Man with sunglasses (ep. 5), Master (ep. 35), Slicer (Younger Brother))
Rockman EXE Axess (2003) (strange old man/shopkeeper)
Area 88 (2004) (Enemy Controller (ep. 2))
Daphne in the Brilliant Blue (2004) (Davis)
Madlax (2004) (Friend)
My-HiME (2004) (Mochizuki (ep. 17), Sawada (ep. 4–5))
Rockman EXE Stream (2004-2005) (NapalmMan, Wan Tanmen)
Ah! My Goddess (2005) (Truck driver (ep. 6))
Glass Mask (2005) (Taichi Hotta)
Yomigaeru Sora - Rescue Wings (2006) (Akihiro Yamaguchi (ep. 8–9))
Pocket Monsters: Diamond and Pearl (2006) (Contesta, Additional voices)
Rockman EXE Beast+ (2006) (strange old man/shopkeeper)
D.Gray-man (2007) (Toma)
Soul Eater (2008) (Jack the Ripper)
Oreca Battle (2014) (Pandora)

Unknown date 

.hack//Legend of the Twilight (Grunty shop owner)
Duel Masters (Mikuni)
Transformers: Prime (Silas)
Gintama (Musashi (recurring), Prince Hata (recurring), Amanto (ep. 5), Crew Cut Boss (ep. 4), Father (ep. 13), Hata-miko, Jaijen (ep. 11–12); Kin'ya (ep. 14), Nojima (ep. 21), Tamo-san; Driving instructor (ep. 72), Oda Nobunaga, skeleton ghost (ep. 132)
Hamtaro (Yumiko's Father)
Kirarin Revolution (TanTan)
MÄR (Edward)

Theatrical animation
Ah! My Goddess: The Movie (2000) (Kawada)
Pokémon Heroes - Latias & Latios (2002) (Lyon's Ariados)
Pokémon: Lucario and the Mystery of Mew (2005) (Hellgar)
Pokémon Ranger and the Temple of the Sea (2006) (Lovecus)
Shin Kyūseishu Densetsu Hokuto no Ken - Raō Den Jun'ai no Shō (2006) (Leader)

Original video animation (OVA)
Sci-Fi Harry (????) (Chris)
Gintama (????) (Prince Hata)
Nurse Witch Komugi (2002) (Director (ep. 1))
Space Pirate Captain Herlock: The Endless Odyssey/Outside Legend (2002) (Operator)
Mobile Suit Gundam: The Origin (2015) (Tem Ray)

Games
Final Fantasy X (2001) (Cid, Kelk Ronso)
Final Fantasy X-2 (2003) (Cid)
Atelier Iris: Eternal Mana (2004) (Delsus)
Call of Duty: Modern Warfare 2 (2009) (Soap)
Castlevania Judgment (2009) (Death)
 .hack//Link (2010) (Posaune)

Live-action
 Kamen Rider Kuuga: Special Chapter: Zu-Gumun-Ba
 Hyakujuu Sentai Gaoranger: Duke Org Yabaiba (Main eps)/Armoured Yabaiba (ep. 30–31) (voice), Civilian (ep. 49–50) (actor)
Hyakujuu Sentai Gaoranger vs. Super Sentai:  Duke Org Yabaiba
Hyakujuu Sentai Gaoranger: The Fire Mountain Roars: Duke Org Yabaiba
Ninpu Sentai Hurricaneger vs. Gaoranger:  Duke Org Yabaiba
Bakuryu Sentai Abaranger: Trinoid 11: Ayameganezumi (ep. 17)
 Tokusou Sentai Dekaranger: Pouchien Boraperno (ep. 28)
 GoGo Sentai Boukenger: Tsukumogami Akutagami (ep. 25)
Juuken Sentai Gekiranger: Five Venom Fist Confrontation Beast Gecko-Fist Moriya (ep. 4, 6)
 Kamen Rider Den-O: Claw-Hand Mole Imagin (ep. 35–36) (Voiced by Daisuke Kirii (Axe-Hand (ep. 35), Akira Sasanuma (Drill-Hand (ep. 35–36))
 Engine Sentai Go-onger: Savage Sky Barbaric Machine Beast Yatai Banki (ep. 39)
 Samurai Sentai Shinkenger: Kusare Ayakashi Azemidoro (ep. 31)
 Tensou Sentai Goseiger: Matroid Bakutofuji-ER of the Timer (ep. 39–40)
 Tokumei Sentai Go-Busters: Omochiloid (ep. 44)
 Ressha Sentai ToQger: Stove Shadow (ep. 4)
 Kamen Rider Ghost: Knife Ganma (ep. 15)

Dubbing

Live-action
Dirty Pretty Things (Guo Yi (Benedict Wong))
Felon (Lt. Jackson (Harold Perrineau))
The Magnificent Seven (Phillips (Griff Furst))
Métal Hurlant Chronicles (Brad Davis (James Marsters))

Animation
Big Hero 6 (Desk Sergeant)
Coco (Plaza Mariachi)
Song of the South (????, Special edition) (Br'er Rabbit)
Thomas & Friends (Ferdinand, Shankar, Etienne, Victor, Beresford, Lord Callan (succeeded Lord Callan from Yasuhiko Kawazu))

References

External links

1968 births
81 Produce voice actors
Living people
Japanese male video game actors
Japanese male voice actors
20th-century Japanese male actors
21st-century Japanese male actors